Pristimantis degener is a species of frogs in the family Strabomantidae.

It is found in Colombia and Ecuador.
Its natural habitats are tropical moist lowland forests and moist montane forests.
It is threatened by habitat loss.

References

degener
Amphibians of Colombia
Amphibians of Ecuador
Amphibians described in 1997
Taxonomy articles created by Polbot